Liu Tianhua (1895–1932) was a Chinese musician and composer best known for his innovative work for the erhu.
Liu's students, such as Jiang Fengzhi and Chen Zhenduo, continued to contribute to the development of the erhu.

He was the younger brother of the poet Liu Bannong.  He died in 1932 at the age of 37.

Work on Chinese music

Liu was a noted erhu and pipa player, and an early pioneer in the modernisation of traditional Chinese music. He joined Cai Yuanpei's Peking University Music Society as an instrumental instructor in 1922. He promoted Chinese music while he was at Peking University, founded the Society for the Improvement of Chinese Music (國樂改進社, Guóyuè Gǎijìnshè) in 1927 and its periodical, the Music Magazine (音樂雜誌, Yīnyuè Zázhì). The society organised classes and formed a musical ensemble to play Chinese music, a forerunner of the modern Chinese orchestra. He made improvements to the traditional fiddle huqin, in particular the erhu, so that it can become an instrument suitable for a modern stage performance, and wrote music for the instrument. He also made changes to the pipa, increasing the number of frets and used an equal-tempered tuning.

Compositions
Titles in pinyin, Chinese characters and English translation.

Erhu
 Bìng Zhōng Yín 1918 (recitation of ill-being; Soliloquy of a Convalescent)
 Yuè Yè 1924 (moon night)
 Kǔmèn zhī Ōu 1926 (song of melancholy)
 Bēi Gē 1927 (song of lament)
 Liáng Xiāo 1928 (beautiful evening)
 Xián Jū Yín 1928 (recitation of leisure)
 Kōng Shān Niǎo Yǔ 1928 (bird song in a desolate mountain)
 Guāngmíng Xíng 1931 (towards brightness)
 Dú Xián Cāo 1932 (Étude on a single string)
 Zhú Yĭng Yáo Hóng 1932 (shadows of candles, flickering red)
 Studies for Erhu No 1 - 47

Pipa
Gē Wǔ Yǐn (Dance Prelude)
Gǎi Jìn Cāo (Improved Étude)
Xū Lài 1929 (Sound of Emptiness)

Arrangement for ensemble
 Variations on Xinshuiling

References

External links

iTunes: Chinese Traditional Erhu music Vol. 1 by Lei Qiang
Treasures Of Chinese Instrumental Music, Erhu
iTunes: Treasures Of Chinese Instrumental Music, Erhu

1895 births
1932 deaths
Chinese male composers
Erhu players
Pipa players
Musicians from Suzhou
People from Zhangjiagang
Deaths from streptococcus infection
Infectious disease deaths in China
Chinese composers
20th-century composers
Burials in Beijing
20th-century male musicians